Tinya Warkhu (Quechua tinya a kind of drum, warkhu hanging, also spelled Tinyahuarco) is a mountain in the Andes of Peru which reaches a height of approximately . It lies in the Junín Region, Tarma Province, Cajas District. Tinya Warkhu is also the name of the village west of the mountain.

References 

Mountains of Peru
Mountains of Junín Region